In mathematics, Ehrling's lemma, also known as Lions' lemma, is a result concerning Banach spaces. It is often used in functional analysis to demonstrate the equivalence of certain norms on Sobolev spaces. It was named after Gunnar Ehrling.

Statement of the lemma

Let (X, ||·||X), (Y, ||·||Y) and (Z, ||·||Z) be three Banach spaces. Assume that:
 X is compactly embedded in Y: i.e. X ⊆ Y and every ||·||X-bounded sequence in X has a subsequence that is ||·||Y-convergent; and
 Y is continuously embedded in Z: i.e. Y ⊆ Z and there is a constant k so that ||y||Z ≤ k||y||Y for every y ∈ Y.
Then, for every ε > 0, there exists a constant C(ε) such that, for all x ∈ X,

Corollary (equivalent norms for Sobolev spaces)

Let Ω ⊂ Rn be open and bounded, and let k ∈ N. Suppose that the Sobolev space Hk(Ω) is compactly embedded in Hk−1(Ω). Then the following two norms on Hk(Ω) are equivalent:

and

For the subspace of Hk(Ω) consisting of those Sobolev functions with zero trace (those that are "zero on the boundary" of Ω), the L2 norm of u can be left out to yield another equivalent norm.

References

Notes

Bibliography
 

Banach spaces
Sobolev spaces
Lemmas in analysis